Schlichem is a river of Baden-Württemberg, Germany.

Geography

Course 

The river approaches the European watershed in the centre of Tieringen. Beyond this, the Upper Bära, which also originates in Tieringen, competes with the Danube.

On its  way westwards through the Swabian Alb, the foothills of the Alb and the Gäulandschaft along the course of the Neckar, the Schlichen crosses or passes through the following towns and communities:

 Tieringen
 Hausen am Tann (750 m. above sea level)
 Ratshausen (675 m. above sea level)
 Schömberg (Schlichemtalsperre: 640 m. above sea level)
 Dautmergen (608 meters above sea level) 
 Täbingen (639 m above sea level)
 Dieting (districts of Böhringen 575 m above sea level, and Rotezimmer 573 m above sea level)
 Epfendorf (570 m. above sea level)

At Schömberg, the Schlichem is dammed up by the Schlichemtalsperre to form a reservoir, which is also developed as a bathing lake. It is crossed by the Schlichem Viaduct of the Balingen-Schömberg railway line. (former railway line Balingen-Rottweil).

East of Epfendorf the Schlichem river flows about two kilometres below the so-called Schlichemklamm. (local name Schlichem-Gumpen) in the nature reserve Schlichemtal, which stretches down to this, from the right into the upper Neckar.

Catchment area 
The catchment area of the Schlichem, which covers almost , borders in the northwest on that of the small downstream Neckar tributary Schenkenbach. Behind the following, very long watershed in the northeast, first the Stunzach, then longer its receiving water Eyach competes. In the southeast the already mentioned Upper Baer runs over the Baer to the Danube, then at the left watershed first in the south the right upper course Lower Baer. In the southwest some other brooks on the other side of the river are again flowing from the right to the Neckar, worth mentioning among them are successively the medium Starzel and the small Weiherbach, which flow to the Neckar via the Prim, and the direct inflow Wettebach.

The highest elevations in the catchment area rise above the plateaus on both sides of the upper course valley in the Alb, which are often above .

Tributaries 
Böllatgraben (left)
Engenbach (right)
Reutegraben (left)
Rötegrabenbach (right)
Waldhausbach (right)
Schlichembach (left)
Steinlegraben (right)
Egertbächle (left)
Wettebach (left)
Talgraben (right)
Mittelbach (left)
Holzingerberggraben (right)
Weilenbach (left)
Hätzenbolgraben (right)
Reisbruckgraben (left)
Hölzlegraben (right)
Galgenbühlgraben (right)
Schönhager-Lochbrunnen (left)
Erlenwiesengraben (left)
Sulzgraben (left)
Hohler Graben (right)
Golterngraben (right)
Weiherbach (left)
Erlenbach (right)
Heimbach (right)
Augraben (right)
Schwarzenbach (left)

See also 
List of rivers of Baden-Württemberg

References

Rivers of Baden-Württemberg
Rivers of Germany